Cardinal de Granvelle's Dwarf or Cardinal de Gravelle's Dwarf Holding a Large Dog is a c.1560 oil on panel painting by Antonis Mor. It shows a person with dwarfism in the household of Antoine Perrenot de Granvelle, resting one hand on a dog (whose collar bears Perrenot de Granvelle's coat of arms, only identified as such in 1899) and holding a sceptre in another. It formed part of superintendent Nicolas Fouquet's collection before being seized from him by Louis XIV and is now in the Louvre Museum (INV 1583).

References

1560 paintings
Portraits of men
16th-century portraits
Paintings in the Louvre by Dutch, Flemish and German artists
Works about dwarfism